Pierre Overney (1948 – 25 February 1972) was a French worker and Maoist political activist. He was killed by a security guard.

Death
Pierre Overney was a worker in the Renault automobile factory. He was fired from his job. On Friday, 25 February 1972, Overney and other activists were distributing pamphlets to the workers as they entered and left the gates. Pierre got into a dispute with security guard Jean-Antoine Tramoni. The guard pulled a gun and shot Overney.

Reactions

Armed actions
On 1 March 1972, in response to the murder, a group of activists set fire to the cars in the Renault depot.

On 8 March 1972, the Maoist organization  kidnapped Robert Nogrette.

Funeral
200,000 attended Overney's funeral, including Jean-Paul Sartre and Michel Foucault.

Trial of Tramoni and action of the NAPAP
Tramoni's trial began in January 1973. The court sentenced him to four years in prison. Following his release from prison on 23 March 1977, Tramoni was killed by the Maoist group Armed Nuclei for Popular Autonomy

Commemoration in culture
French singer Dominique Grange dedicated a song named Pierrot est tombé to Pierre Overney.

See also
 Mao-Spontex
 Gauche prolétarienne

References

External links
 Murder of Pierre Overney  - archival photos

French Maoists